"You Had Your Soul with You" is a song by American indie rock band The National. It appears as the first track on the band's eighth studio album I Am Easy to Find. "You Had Your Soul with You" was released in the United States as the album's first single on March 5, 2019.

Personnel
Credits adapted from I Am Easy to Find liner notes.

 Matt Berninger
 Aaron Dessner
 Bryce Dessner
 Bryan Devendorf
 Scott Devendorf

Charts

Weekly charts

Year-end charts

References

2019 singles
2019 songs
The National (band) songs
4AD singles
Songs written by Matt Berninger
Songs written by Aaron Dessner
Songs written by Bryce Dessner
Song recordings produced by Aaron Dessner
Song recordings produced by Bryce Dessner